Nathan Ssewaali or sometimes spelt Nathan Ssewaali is a Ugandan writer and author based in Canada.

Biography
Born in Kampala, Ssewaali  obtained a Bachelor of Information Science and Library degree from Makerere University, and a postgraduate diploma in infant and child mental health. 
His first poetry book, Lola and The Emotions Carousel, was launched  in 2022.

In 2022, Ssewaali was part of the authors invited to grace the event of The Toronto International Festival of Authors took place in September 2022 in Toronto, Canada.

Family 
Ssewaali lives in Toronto with his family since 2017.

Publications

writing
Lola and The Emotions Carousel

Other considerations
In January, 2021 he started music production as a producer in Canada.

References

External references
Official website
nathan ssewaali

Author Nathan Ssewaali aka Nathan Ssewa drops his first beats - 
Nathan Ssewaali launches his first mental health children's book

Living people
Ugandan writers
People from Kampala District
Makerere University alumni
Ugandan male short story writers
Ugandan short story writers
21st-century Ugandan poets
Ganda people
Ugandan male poets
21st-century short story writers
Ugandan novelists
21st-century male writers
Year of birth missing (living people)